Artemenko (Артеменко), Russified as Artyomenko (Артёменко) is a Ukrainian-language surname derived from the first name Artyom. Notable people with the surname include:

Andrii Artemenko, Ukrainian politician
Oleksandr Artemenko, Ukrainian footballer
Stepan Artyomenko, World War II double Hero of the Soviet Union 
Svyatik Artemenko, Canadian soccer player

See also
 

Ukrainian-language surnames